Jiří Ondrušek (born April 2, 1986) is a Czech professional ice hockey defenceman. He currently plays with HC Olomouc in the First National Hockey League.

Ondrušek made his Czech Extraliga debut playing with HC Vitkovice debut during the 2011–12 Czech Extraliga season.

References

External links

1986 births
Living people
Czech ice hockey defencemen
HC Olomouc players
Sportspeople from Olomouc